The 2021 European Athletics Team Championships Super League have been held in Chorzów, Poland from 29 to 30 May 2021.

Results
There were 40 events (20 men and 20 women). 36 individual and 4 relay races.

Men's

100 metres
29 May; Wind: -0.5 m/s

200 metres
30 May; Wind: -1.0 m/s

400 metres
29 May

800 metres
30 May

1500 metres
29 May

3000 metres
30 May

5000 metres
29 May

110 metres hurdles
30 May; Wind: -0.3 m/s

400 metres hurdles
29 May

3000 metres steeplechase
30 May

4 × 100 metres relay
29 May

4 × 400 metres relay
30 May

High jump
29 May

Pole vault
30 May

Long jump
29 May

Triple jump
30 May

Shot put
29 May

Discus throw
30 May

Hammer throw
30 May

Javelin throw
29 May

Women's

100 metres
29 May; Wind: +1.3 m/s

200 metres
30 May; Wind: +0.6 m/s

400 metres
29 May

800 metres
29 May

1500 metres
30 May

3000 metres
29 May

5000 metres
30 May

100 metres hurdles
30 May; Wind: -0.1 m/s

400 metres hurdles
29 May

3000 metres steeplechase
29 May

4 × 100 metres relay
29 May

4 × 400 metres relay
30 May

High jump
30 May

Pole vault
29 May

Long jump
30 May

Triple jump
29 May

Shot put
30 May

Discus throw
29 May

Hammer throw
29 May

Javelin throw
30 May

Final standings
After 40 out of 40 events.

Medal table
At the European Athletics Team Championships medals are not awarded, but with gold, silver and bronze conventionally refers to the top three finishes.

References

External links
 

2021 European Athletics Team Championships
European Athletics Team Championships Super League